Seán McLoughlin is the name of:

 Jacksepticeye (Seán W. McLoughlin, born 1990), Irish internet personality
Seán McLoughlin (communist) (1895–1960), Irish nationalist and communist activist
Sean McLoughlin (footballer) (born 1996), Irish football (soccer) player (Cork City FC, Hull City AFC, St Mirren FC)
Seán McLoughlin (hurler) (born 1935), Irish hurler
Seán McLoughlin (anthropologist), professor at the University of Leeds

See also
Sean McLaughlin (disambiguation)